Pieni-Onkamo is a medium-sized lake in the Vuoksi main catchment area in Finland. It is located in the North Karelia region. The lake is separated from another lake Suuri-Onkamo with nice esker called Sintsi.

See also
List of lakes in Finland

References

Lakes of Rääkkylä
Lakes of Tohmajärvi